Vardo may refer to:

Vardø, a municipality in Norway
Vardø (town), administrative centre of the municipality
Vårdö, a municipality in Finland
Vardo (Romani wagon), the traditional horse-drawn wagon used by English Romani people
Vardo Rumessen (1942–2015), Estonian musician and politician

See also
Vardos, an Australian musical group